Matthew Tishler is an Emmy-nominated, multi-platinum songwriter and music producer who has written and produced songs for film, television, radio, stage, and theme parks.  He is known for his work with teen pop artists such as Ashley Tisdale, Dove Cameron, Olivia Holt and JoJo Siwa, as well as popular K-pop/J-pop artists like EXO, Taeyeon, Namie Amuro, Kumi Koda, EXILE Atsushi, Twice, Stray Kids and BTS. His projects have combined sales of over 20 million units.

Tishler is responsible for producing and co-writing the theme song to Girl Meets World, "Take on the World", performed by Sabrina Carpenter and Rowan Blanchard. In early 2016, he was responsible for co-producing and co-writing a wave of successful K-pop singles, including "Sing for You" and "For Life" by EXO, "Rain" by Taeyeon from Girls' Generation, and "Good Luck" by AOA charting combined sales in excess of 1.4 million units that year. Tishler co-wrote and co-produced "보조개  (Dimple)" by BTS, which was featured on Love Yourself: Her and Love Yourself: Answer, the #1 albums in Korea for 2017 and 2018, respectively. Tishler also wrote and produced the title track for Namie Amuro's record-breaking album "Finally" (#1 album in Japan for 2017 and 2018), and its accompanying "Finally" DVD/Blu-ray, which is the best-selling music DVD/Blu-ray in Japan of all time. He also produced All I Want by Olivia Rodrigo.

Selected discography

Album credits 
2016 – present:

2010 – 2015:

Film/television credits 
 Lemonade Mouth (Disney Channel)
 Sharpay's Fabulous Adventure (Disney Channel)
 Shake It Up (Disney Channel)
 Austin & Ally (Disney Channel)
 A.N.T. Farm (Disney Channel)
 Radio Rebel (Disney Channel)
 Girl vs. Monster (Disney Channel)
 How To Rock (Nickelodeon)
 Hollywood Heights (Nickelodeon) – Theme Song
 The Fresh Beat Band (Nickelodeon)
 To The Beautiful You (SBS)
 Hi wa Mata Noboru (TV Asahi) – Theme Song
 Nazotoki wa Dinner no Ato de (Fuji TV) – Theme Song
 Chase (NBC)
 12 Dates of Christmas (ABC Family)
 Degrassi: The Next Generation
 Unstable (CMT)
 Pretty Little Liars (ABC Family)
 Snooki & JWoww (MTV)
 People's Choice Awards (CBS)
 E! News (E!)
 Blaze and the Monster Machines (Nickelodeon)
 Dora and Friends: Into the City! (Nickelodeon)
 Girl Meets World (Disney Channel)
 Corn & Peg (Nickelodeon)
 I Am Frankie (Nickelodeon) – Theme Song
 Fancy Nancy (Disney Junior)
 Pup Academy (Disney Channel)
 Mira, Royal Detective (Disney Junior)
 Barbie: Princess Adventure (Netflix)
 Barbie: Big City, Big Dreams (Netflix)
 Barbie It Takes Two (Netflix)
 Team Zenko Go (Netflix) - Theme Song

Miscellaneous credits 
 Official Coca-Cola UEFA Euro 2012 Anthem (Coca-Cola)
 JibJab – "Santa's Twerk Shop" E-Card
 Disney Parks Christmas Day Parade – "Baby, It's Cold Outside" performed by Jason Derulo and Jordin Sparks
 "Put a Little Love in Your Heart" (Coca-Cola Commercial)
 "Fa La La" (McDonald's Commercial)
 My Little Pony (Hasbro)
 Equestria Girls (Hasbro)
 FurReal Friends (Hasbro)
 Baby Alive (Hasbro)

References

External links 
 

Canadian songwriters
Living people
Musicians from Toronto
J-pop musicians
Canadian record producers
Year of birth missing (living people)